The 2021 Washington State Cougars football team represented Washington State University during the 2021 NCAA Division I FBS football season. They were led by second-year head coach Nick Rolovich in the first 7 games; Rolovich was fired on October 18 after refusing to comply with Washington's COVID-19 vaccination mandate. Defensive Coordinator Jake Dickert took over as the team's interim head coach for the reminder of the season. He was announced as the Cougars 34th head coach following their Apple Cup victory on November. The team played their home games in Martin Stadium in Pullman, Washington, and competed as members of the North Division of the Pac-12 Conference.

After finished the regular season with a 7–5 overall record, the Cougars accepted an invitation to the Sun Bowl, to face the Miami Hurricanes. On December 26, the Hurricanes announced that they would not be able to play, due to COVID-19 issues; organizers stated that they would try to secure a replacement team to face the Cougars. On December 27, the Central Michigan Chippewas were named as the Sun Bowl replacement team. The Chippewas had originally been scheduled to face the Boise State Broncos in the Arizona Bowl, until the Broncos had to withdraw due to COVID-19 issues and the Arizona Bowl was canceled.

Schedule

Game summaries

vs Utah State

vs Portland State

vs USC

at Utah

at California

vs Oregon State

vs Stanford

vs BYU

at Arizona State

at No. 3 Oregon

vs Arizona

at Washington

Sun Bowl

Awards

Staff

Rankings

References

Washington State
Washington State Cougars football seasons
Washington State Cougars football